The men's 10000 metres competition at the 2018 Asian Games took place on 26 August 2018 at the Gelora Bung Karno Stadium.

Schedule
All times are Western Indonesia Time (UTC+07:00)

Records

Results
Legend
DNF — Did not finish
DSQ — Disqualified

 Hassan Chani of Bahrain originally won the gold medal, but was disqualified because of his biological passport abnormalities.

References

Men's 10000 metres
2018